The South Texas Botanical Gardens & Nature Center, formerly known as the Corpus Christi Botanical Gardens and Nature Center is a nonprofit, 180-acre botanical garden and nature center located at 8545 South Staples, Corpus Christi, Texas. It is open daily; an admission fee is charged.

The gardens can be traced to 1987 when a first cottage garden (1 acre) and nature trail opened in Corpus Christi. Today's gardens, however, are on a different site that opened in 1996. The gardens have been actively developed since that time.

Major exhibits now include an arid garden; Exhibit House with bromeliads, cycads, cacti, and succulents; hibiscus garden; hummingbird garden; landscape demonstration beds; orchid house with more than 3000 orchids; a major collection of more than 100 plumeria varieties; contemporary rose garden with a large pavilion; sensory garden; and water garden.

The site also contains a mesquite nature trail through  of brush. It features some 35 species of woody trees and shrubs, herbs, grasses, and cacti, as well as white-tailed deer, collared peccaries, and coyotes.

See also 
 Hans and Pat Suter Wildlife Refuge
 List of botanical gardens in the United States

External links 
 South Texas Botanical Gardens and Nature Center

Botanical gardens in Texas
Nature centers in Texas
Protected areas of Nueces County, Texas
Geography of Corpus Christi, Texas
Education in Corpus Christi, Texas
Tourist attractions in Corpus Christi, Texas
1987 establishments in Texas
Buildings and structures in Corpus Christi, Texas